Birjhora Mahavidyalaya, popularly known as Birjhora Science College, is a co-educational  science college. It was established in 1986 in Bongaigaon, Assam, India.

About
Initially started by a sponsoring committee namely "Birjhora Mahavidyala Nirman Committee" headed by Sri P.B. Chaudhury, MLA, with the active support and co-operation from the local people and organizations, the college has subsequently been taken over by the education department of the state under deficit Grand-In-Aids system w.e.f. 1 January-1990 and The college was provincialized w.e.f December-2005. The college is one of the premier institutions for higher education offering Degree Courses in Science recognized by UGC. The college is affiliated to Gauhati university and has been awarded with B-Grade certification by NAAC (National Assessment and Accreditation Council) with 80% in the criteria of teaching, Learning and Evaluation.

Courses
Birjhora Mahavidyalaya is a multi-disciplinary (Degree Science, IT) co-educational degree college affiliated to the Gauhati University. Apart from the traditional degree courses, the college also offers several courses of study in Information Technology.
The various course options available to the students of Birjhora Mahavidyalaya are as follows:

 Three year B.Sc. Major (Semester System).
 Three year B.Sc. General course (Semester System).
 Three year B.Sc. Vocational Course in Information Technology (Semester System).
 Certificate course in Information Technology.(One year)
 Post Graduate Diploma in Computer Application (PGDCA)
 Certificate course in Mushroom cultivation

Major courses
Major Subjects: Physics, Chemistry, Mathematics, Botany, Zoology and Statistics. 

General Subjects:  English, Botany, Chemistry, Economics, Mathematics, Physics, Statistics, Zoology and Information Technology.

Other courses
In addition to the above, Degree/Diploma/Certificate courses in various disciplines are available through distance education mode:

 IGNOU (Indira Gandhi Open University) Study Centre
 IDOL (Institute of Distance Learning, Guhati University)
 KKHSOU (Krishna Kanta Handique State Open University)

References

External links
Birjhora Mahavidyalaya

Educational institutions established in 1986
Gauhati University
Universities and colleges in Assam
1986 establishments in Assam
Colleges affiliated to Gauhati University
Bongaigaon
Bongaigaon district
Education in Bongaigaon
Colleges in Bongaigaon